Source Code Pro is a monospaced sans serif typeface created by Paul D. Hunt for Adobe Systems. It is the second open-source font family from Adobe, distributed under the SIL Open Font License.

Source Code Pro (2012)
Source Code Pro is a set of monospaced OpenType fonts that have been designed to work well in coding environments. This family of fonts is a complementary design to the Source Sans family. It is available in seven weights (Extralight, Light, Regular, Medium, Semibold, Bold, Black).

Changes from Source Sans Pro include:
Long x-height
 Dotted zero
Redesigned i, j, and l
Increased sizes of punctuation marks
Optimized shapes of important characters like the greater- and less-than signs
Adjusted heights of dashes and mathematical symbols improving alignment with each other

The font has been regularly upgraded since the first release. Italics styles were added in 2015, and variable formats in 2018.

See also

Adobe's open-source family
 Source Sans, the first member of Adobe's open-source family.
 Source Serif, the third member of Adobe's open-source family.
 Source Han Sans, the fourth member of Adobe's open-source family and the first to include CJK characters.
 Source Han Serif, the last member of Adobe's open source family and includes CJK characters.

References

External links

Adobe Systems Incorporated pages: Source Code Pro
Source Code Pro specimen on GitHub

Free software Unicode typefaces
Monospaced typefaces
Adobe typefaces
Typefaces designed by Paul D. Hunt
Sans-serif typefaces
Typefaces and fonts introduced in 2012